WEPN may refer to:

 WEPN (AM), 1050 kHz, an ESPN affiliated sport radio station in New York City.
 WEPN-FM, 98.7 MHz, an ESPN affiliated sport radio station in New York City.